Eren Aydın (born 16 January 1982) is a Turkish football coach and a former player. He played as a left back. As a coach, he works as an assistant to Ümit Özat.

References

 Boluspor'da 8 futbolcu ayrıldı, sabah.com, 30 December 2015

External links
 
 
 

1982 births
Living people
People from Beykoz
Turkish footballers
Gençlerbirliği S.K. footballers
Turanspor footballers
Malatyaspor footballers
Ankaraspor footballers
İstanbul Başakşehir F.K. players
Sivasspor footballers
Süper Lig players
Batman Petrolspor footballers
Footballers from Istanbul
Elazığspor footballers
Association football defenders